The Presidential Palace is the executive office and official residence of the Myanmar head of state and government, the president of Myanmar, and located in the capital city of Nay Pyi Taw. The 100-room palace is a complex of buildings, surrounded by a moat that can be crossed by bridges.

Acting President Myint Swe did not move into the Presidential Palace following the 2021 coup d'état. Instead, junta leader Min Aung Hlaing occupies the palace. Min Aung Hlaing has held diplomatic receptions and award ceremonies at the palace, for which he has worn the presidential sash, despite not being the president.

Gallery

See also
Government House, Rangoon

References 

Presidential residences
Residential buildings completed in 2010
Buildings and structures in Naypyidaw
2010 establishments in Myanmar